, a former Vice Minister of the Japanese Ministry of Home Affairs, served as the Director General of the Nagano Olympic Organizing Committee (NAOC) for the 1998 Winter Olympics and Paralympics which were held in Nagano, Japan.

Beginning in April 1996, Kobayashi held monthly press conferences to update the public on progress towards the Games. During the 107th IOC Session on February 2, 1998, Kobayashi acted as master of ceremonies.

In the lead up to the 1998 Games, among other duties, Kobayashi represented the NAOC on the Olympic Technology Working Group, which met to resolve contract issues between the NAOC and IBM. In his role as Director General of the Games, Kobayashi also served as Chief of Operations.

References

Bibliography
 
 

1998 Winter Olympics
1998 Winter Paralympics